Phitsanulok Songkwae Football Club (Thai สโมสรฟุตบอลพิษณุโลกสองแคว) is a Thailand semi professional football club based in Phitsanulok Province. They currently play in Thai Football Amateur Tournament.

Record

References
 http://www.supersubthailand.com/news/17328-33/index.html#sthash.VTNC2Ii8.dpbs
 http://www.thailive.net/2017/07/05/%E0%B8%AE%E0%B8%B7%E0%B8%AD%E0%B8%AE%E0%B8%B2%E0%B8%9E%E0%B8%B4%E0%B8%A9%E0%B8%93%E0%B8%B8%E0%B9%82%E0%B8%A5%E0%B8%81%E0%B8%AF%E0%B8%8B%E0%B8%B4%E0%B8%A7%E0%B9%81%E0%B8%82%E0%B9%89%E0%B8%87%E0%B8%A5/
 https://www.youtube.com/watch?v=vxQLNVgfwL0

External links 
 Official Facebookpage of Phitsanulok Songkwae FC

Association football clubs established in 2009
Football clubs in Thailand
2009 establishments in Thailand